SkyGrabber is a software from the Russian company SkySoftware which accepts input from a digital satellite tuner card for hard drive recording.

History
It was used by Iraqi insurgents from the group Kata'ib Hezbollah to intercept MQ-1 Predator drone video feeds, which were not encrypted. The encryption for the feeds was removed for performance reasons.

See also
 Comparison of packet analyzers
 Satellite Internet access

References

External links
 Official site

Computer surveillance
Network analyzers